The Wright Brothers Memorial Trophy was established by the National Aeronautic Association (NAA) in 1948 after a trust fund was created in 1936 by Godfrey Lowell Cabot of Boston, a former president of the NAA. It is awarded to a living American for "significant public service of enduring value to aviation in the United States." The presentation of the award is made annually at the Aero Club of Washington, as close as possible to December 17 each year, the day on which, in 1903, the Wright brothers made the first flight in an airplane. The inaugural recipient of the trophy was William F. Durand, "a pioneer in aeronautics, naval propulsion and engineering research methods". Until 2010, winners of the award received a trophy depicting the Wright brothers' Wright Flyer aircraft. From 2010 onwards, a redesigned trophy featuring a silver obelisk and bronze inscription has been awarded.

The trophy has only been awarded to women on three occasions. Olive Ann Beech, founding partner and president of Beech Aircraft, received the award in 1980; Marion Blakey, former administrator of the Federal Aviation Administration and chairman of the National Transportation Safety Board was honored in 2013, and the 2016 recipient was Colleen Barrett, President Emeritus of Southwest Airlines. The most recent winner of the Wright Brothers Memorial Trophy, in 2019, was Michael Collins.

List of winners

See also

 List of aviation awards
 Wright Brothers Medal

References

External links
 Aero Club of Washington
 The National Aeronautic Association (NAA) list of Wright Memorial Trophy winners

Aviation awards
Wright brothers
American awards
Awards established in 1948